In mathematics, the Hilbert projection theorem is a famous result of convex analysis that says that for every vector  in a Hilbert space  and every nonempty closed convex  there exists a unique vector  for which  is minimized over the vectors ; that is, such that  for every

Finite dimensional case 

Some intuition for the theorem can be obtained by considering the first order condition of the optimization problem.

In matrix derivative notation

Since  is a vector in  that represents an arbitrary tangent direction, it follows that  must be orthogonal to every vector in

Statement

Detailed elementary proof

Proof by reduction to a special case 

It suffices to prove the theorem in the case of  because the general case follows from the statement below by replacing  with

Consequences 

: 

If  then 
 
which implies  

: 

which is continuous and linear because this is true of each of its coordinates  
The kernel of any linear map is a vector subspace of its domain, which is why  is a vector subspace of  

: 

Let  
The Hilbert projection theorem guarantees the existence of a unique  such that  (or equivalently, for all ). 
Let  so that  and it remains to show that  
The inequality above can be rewritten as:

The previous inequality thus becomes

or equivalently,
 
But this last statement is true if and only if  every  Thus

Properties 

Expression as a global minimum

The statement and conclusion of the Hilbert projection theorem can be expressed in terms of global minimums of the followings functions. Their notation will also be used to simplify certain statements.

Given a non-empty subset  and some  define a function 
 
A  of  if one exists, is any point  in  such that 
 
 

Effects of translations and scalings

The Hilbert projection theorem guarantees that this unique minimum point exists whenever  is a non-empty closed and convex subset of a Hilbert space. 

which implies:

Examples

The following counter-example demonstrates a continuous linear isomorphism  for which  
Endow  with the dot product, let  and for every real  let  be the line of slope  through the origin, where it is readily verified that  
Then  is an invertible continuous linear operator that satisfies  and  
so that  and  

See also

Notes

References

Bibliography 

 
  

Convex analysis
Theorems in functional analysis